Imperator: Rome is a grand strategy wargame developed and published by Paradox Interactive, which was released on 25 April 2019. It is a spiritual successor to Europa Universalis: Rome, released by Paradox in 2008. It received generally positive reviews from critics.

Gameplay
The map spans from the Iberian Peninsula to India, and features over 7,000 cities. As with previous games from Paradox, all of the nations in the game are playable. The game advertises a variety of features, including character management, diverse population, new battle tactics, military traditions, different governmental types, barbarians and rebellions, trade, and provincial improvement.

Development
The game was developed by Paradox Development Studio and directed by Johan Andersson. Formally unveiled in May 2018, the game was released on 25 April the following year for Microsoft Windows, macOS, and Linux. Imperator: Rome focuses primarily on nations and empires, with a small focus on character management like the game set after it timewise, Crusader Kings III; Andersson hoped that Paradox could make a modern sequel to Europa Universalis: Rome. As with recent Paradox Development Studio games, Imperator: Rome was built using the Clausewitz Engine, but with the addition of new software known as "Jomini" (named after 19th century general Antoine-Henri Jomini) that allows for easier and faster creation of mods.

The development and support for the game was paused by Paradox Interactive on 30 April 2021. On 27 June 2022, a post on the Paradox Interactive Forums received a response from a community manager stating that all support and development on the game has been cancelled.

Expansions

Reception

The game received "generally favorable reviews", according to review aggregator Metacritic. IGN praised the game for its depth, "the amount of detailed, strategic stuff crammed into Imperator: Rome is equal parts impressive and daunting", while criticizing the game's user interface and tribal nations. The review also praised the game's political system, writing that the political warfare between people within nations is "a great driver of character interaction". PC Gamer described the game as "uniting systems from the most recent games" while still being "more cohesive than a 'greatest hits' compilation". Despite lower user ratings than they expected, the game's sales surpassed Paradox's expectations.

References

External links
 
 

2019 video games
Grand strategy video games
Linux games
MacOS games
Paradox Interactive games
Video game sequels
Video games developed in Sweden
Video games set in antiquity
Video games set in the Roman Empire
Windows games